is a railway station in Aoi-ku, Shizuoka, Shizuoka Prefecture, Japan, operated by the private railway company, Shizuoka Railway (Shizutetsu).

Lines
Yunoki Station is a  station on the Shizuoka–Shimizu Line and is 2.0 kilometers from the starting point of the line at Shin-Shizuoka Station.

Station layout
The station has two parallel side platforms. The station building is built onto one end of one of the platforms, and has automated ticket machines, and automated turnstiles, which accept the LuLuCa smart card ticketing system as well as the PiTaPa and ICOCA IC cards.

Platforms

Adjacent stations

|-
!colspan=5| Shizuoka Railway Company

Station History
The station received its present name after World War II.

Passenger statistics
In fiscal 2017, the station was used by an average of 1622 passengers daily (boarding passengers only).

Surrounding area
Shizuoka Gokoku Jinja
Tokai University Junior College
 JR Tokai Shizuoka Rail Yard

See also
 List of railway stations in Japan

References

External links

 Shizuoka Railway official website

}

Railway stations in Shizuoka Prefecture
Railway stations in Japan opened in 1908
Railway stations in Shizuoka (city)